The Dr. E.P. McGehee Infirmary is a historic medical complex at 614 South Cokley Street in Lake Village, Arkansas.  The complex began as a single wood-frame structure in 1910 serving as a medical clinic for the local African-American population.  It was the town's primary infirmary from its establishment until 1973.  It was established and operated by Dr. Edward Pelham McGehee until his death in 1950.  It is now home to the Museum of Chicot County.

The complex was listed on the National Register of Historic Places in 2005.

See also
National Register of Historic Places listings in Chicot County, Arkansas

References

Hospital buildings on the National Register of Historic Places in Arkansas
Colonial Revival architecture in Arkansas
Buildings and structures completed in 1910
Buildings and structures in Chicot County, Arkansas
National Register of Historic Places in Chicot County, Arkansas
Lake Village, Arkansas